Events from the year 1742 in Sweden

Incumbents
 Monarch – Frederick I

Events

 - The Kosta Glasbruk is founded. 
 June - The Swedish province of Finland is occupied of the Empire of Russia during the Lesser Wrath.
 9 August - The Swedish forces in Finland surrender to the Russian army in Helsingfors. 
 - Empress Elizabeth I of Russia states that Sweden may have Finland back if her candidate in the election for an heir to the Swedish throne, Adolf Frederik of Holstein-Gottorp, is accepted.
 - Proclamation of the Kingdom of Finland (1742)
 - The Hats (party) lose government power and are replaced by a government supported by the Caps (party). 
 - Anders Celsius construct the Celsius thermometer. 
 - Adelriks och Giöthildas äfwentyr by Jacob Henrik Mörk.

Births

 
 28 July - Rutger Macklean, driving figure in the reorganization of agricultural lands (died 1816) 
 3 October - Anders Jahan Retzius, scientist (died 1821) 
 - Christina Krook, educator  (died 1806) 
 9 December – Carl Wilhelm Scheele, chemist (died 1786)

Deaths

 
 17 April – Arvid Horn, politician (born 1664) 
 - Lars Roberg, physician (born 1664) 
 June 21 - Johannes Steuchius, arch bishop (born 1676)

References

 
Years of the 18th century in Sweden
Sweden